Wanganui and Rangitikei is a former parliamentary electorate that existed from 1853 to 1860. It was represented by two Members of Parliament.

Population centres
The New Zealand Constitution Act 1852, passed by the British government, allowed New Zealand to establish a representative government. The initial 24 New Zealand electorates were defined by Governor George Grey in March 1853. Wanganui and Rangitikei was one of the initial single-member electorates. The electorate comprised two areas fronting onto the South Taranaki Bight: the area around the town of Wanganui, and a larger area further east stretching further inland along the Rangitikei River.

The Constitution Act also allowed the House of Representatives to establish new electorates and make changes to existing electorates, and this was first done through 'The Electoral Districts Act, 1858'. At that time, four new electorates were formed by splitting existing electorates, and the previously unincorporated land in the North Island was assigned to various electorates.

In the 1860 electoral redistribution, the House of Representatives increased the number of representatives by 12, reflecting the immense population growth since the original electorates were established in 1853. The redistribution created 15 additional electorates with between one and three members, and Wanganui and Rangitikei was split into two separate electorates: the  electorate and the  electorate.

History
Dr Isaac Featherston was the first representative; he had been elected unopposed. Featherston resigned on 9 August 1855, but this did not cause a by-election, as the next election was to be held later that year anyway.

The next representative was William Fox, who was also elected unopposed. Fox served until the end of the parliamentary term in 1860, when the electorate was abolished. Fox successfully contested the Rangitikei electorate in the 1861 election.

Members
During that time, Wanganui and Rangitikei was represented by two Members of Parliament:

Key

Notes

References

External links
 The Electoral Districts Act, 1858

Historical electorates of New Zealand
Politics of Manawatū-Whanganui
1853 establishments in New Zealand
1860 disestablishments in New Zealand